Russian Doll is an American comedy-drama television series, created by Natasha Lyonne, Leslye Headland, and Amy Poehler, that premiered on Netflix on February 1, 2019. The series follows Nadia Vulvokov (Lyonne), a game developer who repeatedly dies and relives the same night in an ongoing time loop and tries to solve it, leading to her finding Alan Zaveri (Charlie Barnett) in the same situation. It also stars Greta Lee, Yul Vazquez, Elizabeth Ashley, and Chloë Sevigny.

Its first season received four Primetime Emmy Award nominations, including Outstanding Comedy Series and Outstanding Lead Actress in a Comedy Series for Lyonne. In June 2019, the series was renewed for a second season, which premiered on April 20, 2022.

Premise
Russian Doll follows a woman named Nadia who is caught in a time loop as the guest of honor at her seemingly inescapable 36th birthday party one night in New York City. She dies repeatedly, always restarting at the same moment at the party, as she tries to figure out what is happening to her. She meets a man who is experiencing the same thing in a different event.

In season 2, Nadia is 10 days away from celebrating her 40th birthday when the 6 Train sends her back in time to 1982. She soon discovers she is trapped inside the body of her mother, Lenora, who is pregnant with her. Nadia decides to pursue the gold Krugerrands her mother lost that same year, in order to change the course of her family's history.

Cast and characters

Main
 Natasha Lyonne as Nadia Vulvokov, a software engineer who finds herself reliving her 36th birthday party in an ongoing time loop wherein she repeatedly dies and the process begins again
 Brooke Timber portrays young Nadia
 Greta Lee as Maxine, Nadia's friend, who throws her 36th birthday party
 Yul Vazquez as John Reyes (season 1), a real estate agent and Nadia's ex-boyfriend who is currently in the process of divorcing his wife
 Elizabeth Ashley as Ruth Brenner, a therapist and close family friend of both Nadia and her mother
 Kate Jennings Grant (guest season 1) and Annie Murphy (recurring season 2)  portray a young Ruth
 Charlie Barnett as Alan Zaveri, a man who is also stuck in a time loop like Nadia
 Chloë Sevigny as Lenora Vulvokov (season 2; guest season 1), Nadia's mother with whom she had a difficult childhood

Recurring
 Jeremy Bobb as Mike Kershaw, a college literature professor with whom Beatrice is having an affair
 Brendan Sexton III as Horse, a homeless man whom Nadia helps out
 Rebecca Henderson as Lizzy, an artist, and friend of Nadia and Maxine
 Ritesh Rajan as Ferran, a friend of Alan's who works at a deli
 Ken Beck as a paramedic 
 Dascha Polanco as Beatrice (season 1), Alan's girlfriend, whom he wishes to propose to
 Sharlto Copley as Chezare "Chez" Carrera (season 2), Lenora's boyfriend in 1982
 Irén Bordán as Vera Peschauer (season 2), Lenora's mother and Nadia's grandmother, appears in 1982 and 1968
 Ilona McCrea portrays young Vera in 1944
 Athina Papadimitriu as Delia (season 2), Vera's longtime best friend and supporter, appears in 1982 and 1968
 Franciscka Farkas portrays young Delia in 1944
 Ephraim Sykes as Derek (season 2), a member of the Guardian Angels watching over the subway in 1982
 Rosie O'Donnell voices the subway announcer (season 2)

Guest
 Max Knoblauch as a paramedic
 Yoni Lotan as Ryan, a paramedic 
 Waris Ahluwalia as Wardog, Maxine's drug dealer
 David Cale as Dr. Daniel (season 1), a man who concocts the drugs that Wardog sells
 Devin Ratray as a deli customer whom Nadia interrupts as he is purchasing a lottery ticket (season 1)
 Tami Sagher as Shifra (season 1), a secretary for the rabbi at the Tifereth Israel Synagogue
 Jonathan Hadary as the rabbi at the Tifereth Israel Synagogue whom Nadia seeks out to ask questions about the building where her party was thrown (season 1)
 Lillias White as Dr. Zaveri, Alan's mother
 Burt Young as Joe (season 1), a tenant in Alan's apartment building
 Mirirai Sithole as Audrey, Alan's neighbor
 Michelle Buteau as a woman who pepper sprays Alan when she thinks he is stalking her (season 1)
 Jocelyn Bioh as Claire (season 1)
 Anoop Desai as Salim (season 2), Ferran’s father and owner of the convenience store in 1982
 Danielle Perez as a librarian (season 2)
 Max Baker as a doctor in a psychiatric ward (season 2)
 Sandor Funtek as Lenny (season 2)
 Carolyn Michelle Smith as Agnes, Alan's grandmother (season 2)
 Balázs Czukor as Kristóf Halázs (season 2)
 Gergely Csiby as a German officer (season 2)
 Piroska Molnár as a Hungarian woman who yells at Nadia and Maxine (season 2)
 Phillipp Droste as Lukas (season 2)
 Tulian Aczel as Bruno (season 2)

Episodes

Series overview

Season 1 (2019)

Season 2 (2022)

Production
The series was created by Natasha Lyonne, Amy Poehler, and Leslye Headland, all of whom also serve as executive producers. Production companies involved with the series consist of Universal Television, Paper Kite Productions, Jax Media, Animal Pictures, and 3 Arts Entertainment. Headland served as showrunner for the first season, while Lyonne took over as showrunner for the second season.

Alongside the initial series order announcement, it was confirmed that Lyonne would star in the series. Alongside the premiere announcement, it was confirmed that Greta Lee, Yul Vazquez, Elizabeth Ashley, and Charlie Barnett had joined the main cast and that Chloë Sevigny, Dascha Polanco, Brendan Sexton III, Rebecca Henderson, Jeremy Bobb, Ritesh Rajan, and Jocelyn Bioh would make guest appearances. In March 2021, Annie Murphy was cast for the second season in an undisclosed role and capacity while Carolyn Michelle Smith joined the cast in a recurring role. In April 2021, Sharlto Copley and Ephraim Sykes joined the cast in an undisclosed roles and capacity for the second season.

Principal photography for season one began on February 22, 2018, in New York City.

On June 11, 2019, Netflix renewed the series for a second season. In March 2020, filming for season two was delayed due to the COVID-19 pandemic. Production began one year later in March 2021. The season 2 finale sequence was filmed at the underground cisterns in Budapest.

The series creators said in interviews that they had ideas for a third season.

Music
The song "Gotta Get Up" by American singer-songwriter Harry Nilsson was used as the "reset" song each time the character Nadia dies and is resurrected in the first season of the series. Lyonne explained to The New York Times that in choosing the song she was struck by the "buoyant doomsday quality" of Nilsson's life. Other contenders for the reset song included "Not Tonight" by Lil' Kim, "Crazy Feeling" by Lou Reed and "No Fun" by the Stooges. Though Netflix finally obtained the usage rights to Nilsson's song, the cost of using it so many times took up a significant portion of the music budget. His estate also limited how many times the song could be used. According to music supervisor Brienne Rose, the production was able to "find a balance between the maximum number of uses and what the budget would allow." The "reset" song utilized for the character Alan was Beethoven's "Piano Concerto No. 4 in G Major".

Release
On January 9, 2019, Netflix released the first trailer for the series. On January 23, 2019, the series held its official premiere at the Metrograph theater in New York City. Those in attendance included series writer Jocelyn Bioh, Taylor Schilling, Natasha Lyonne, Fred Armisen, Amy Poehler, Chloë Sevigny, Greta Lee, Dascha Polanco, Rosie O'Donnell, Danielle Brooks, Laura Prepon, and David Harbour. The series premiered on Netflix on February 1, 2019. The second season was released on April 20, 2022.

Reception

Critical response

Season 1
The first season received widespread critical acclaim. On the review aggregation website Rotten Tomatoes, it holds a 97% approval rating with an average rating of 8.5/10, based on 98 reviews. The website's critics consensus reads, "Russian Doll may be stuck in a time loop, but this endlessly inventive series never repeats itself as it teeters on a seesaw of shifting tones – from fatally funny to mournfully sad – that is balanced with exhilarating moxie by an astonishing Natasha Lyonne." Metacritic, which uses a weighted average, assigned the first season score of 88 out of 100 based on 26 critics, indicating "universal acclaim."

Alicia Lutes of IGN gave the first season a 10/10. Praising the series, she adds that it is "an inventive, unpredictable ride that will easily stand as one of the best shows of the year." In a positive review, Rolling Stones Alan Sepinwall awarded the series  stars out of 5 and praised it saying, "That blend of tones, and the controlled mania of Lyonne's brilliant performance, makes Russian Doll feel like something wholly new, even as it cops to its many influences." The New York Times James Poniewozik was similarly approving saying, "Russian Doll is lean and snappily paced; it even managed the rare feat, in the era of streaming-TV bloat, of making me wish for a bit more." Colliders Haleigh Foutch was equally enthusiastic giving the series a rating of 5 out of 5 stars and applauding it saying, "It's pure binge-watching magic; a show that's not only expertly designed to compel viewers to the next episode but invests just as much in the integrity of story and character." Times Judy Berman described the series as "cerebral yet propulsive" and praised its many layers calling it, "2019's best new show to date."

Season 2
The second season has received widespread critical acclaim. On Rotten Tomatoes, it has a 97% approval rating with an average rating of 8/10, based on 61 reviews. The website's critics consensus states, "Not all of Russian Dolls gambles pay off in this ambitious and thrillingly audacious second season, but the show's willingness to take risks is often its own reward." On Metacritic, it has a weighted average score of 79 out of 100, based on 25 critics, indicating "generally favorable reviews.

In a perfect five-star review by Rebecca Nicholson from The Guardian, she described it as "a truly gorgeous series, from its aesthetic to its script, and it feels incredibly rich." A Los Angeles Times review by Robert Lloyd applauded the season by stating, "It's helpful to regard the series, especially in the whipsaw transitions of its beautiful last movements, as musical or poetic." Another positive review by Colliders Ross Bonaime commended the writers of season two, explaining that, "Russian Dolls second season is a truly wild ride, even when compared to the circuital first season, but it's the looseness and free-flowing exploration of the past that makes this season so remarkable." In an enthusiastic review, Matt Fowler of IGN praised the series, exclaiming that "Russian Dolls second season finds a way to keep the feistiness of time trickery alive with a Quantum Leap-style story that, of course, leads to wonderfully tender and meaningful catharsis." Rolling Stones Alan Sepinwall gave the season 4 out of 5 stars, calling it a "blast" and noting that "in reaching further and trying more, Russian Doll Season Two ultimately justifies the series’ existence as more than just a one-shot." The second season earned a Reframe Stamp since the series "was found to hire women or individuals of other underrepresented gender identities (including those who are non-binary or gender non-conforming) in at least four out of eight key roles including writer, director, producer, lead, co-leads and department heads."

Accolades

Notes

References

External links
 
 

2019 American television series debuts
2010s American comedy-drama television series
2010s American mystery television series
2010s American time travel television series
2020s American comedy-drama television series
2020s American mystery television series
2020s American time travel television series
English-language Netflix original programming
Fiction about body swapping
Fiction about memory erasure and alteration
Magic realism television series
Existentialist television series
Time loop television series
Television productions suspended due to the COVID-19 pandemic
Television series about Jews and Judaism
Television series about multiple time paths
Television series about parallel universes
Television series by 3 Arts Entertainment
Television series by Paper Kite Productions
Television series by Universal Television
Television series created by Amy Poehler
Television shows about death
Television series set in 1982
Television series set in 2018
Television series set in 2022
Television shows set in New York City